Crocodile Hunter may refer to:

Steve Irwin (1962–2006), star of The Crocodile Hunter
The Crocodile Hunter, TV nature program
Crocodile Hunter (film), a 1989 Hong Kong film
The Crocodile Hunter: Collision Course, 2002 adventure comedy film